A portière is a hanging curtain placed over a door or over the doorless entrance to a room.

History
From Asia, it came to Europe at a remote date. It is known to have been in use in Europe in the 4th century, and was probably introduced much earlier. Like so many other domestic plenishings, it reached England by way of France, where it appears to have been originally called rideau de Porte (literally, "door curtain").

Common in wealthier households during the Victorian era, it is still occasionally used either as an ornament or as a means of mitigating draughts. It is usually of some heavy material, such as velvet, brocade, or plush, and is often fixed upon a brass arm, moving in a socket with the opening and closing of the door.

Rising portière
A rising portière is a simple but effective mechanism. It is fastened to both the door and to the wall near the hinge, such that the rail raises itself when the door is opened. This allows the curtain to be long enough to seal against the floor and contain draughts, but not drag on the floor or catch under the door when the door is opened. Rising portières come in different configurations to seal the curtain against different door surrounds.

See also
 Noren (less insulating door curtain)

Notes

References

Furnishings
Textiles
Doors